A Universal Orbital Support System is a concept for suspending an object from a tether orbiting in space.

Explanation

Background
A concept for providing space-based support to things suspended above an astronomical object. It is envisioned as a type of non-rotating tethered satellite system. The orbital system is a coupled mass system wherein the upper supporting mass (A) is placed in an orbit around a given celestial body such that it can support a suspended mass (B) at a specific height above the surface of the celestial body, but lower than (A). The relationship between (A) and (B) is such that it (A) moves higher as (B) is lowered towards the surface, the distance is related as an inverse proportion of their masses.

Example 
This system has been proposed for the Analemma Tower concept, which employs the system to suspend a building from a cable supported by an asteroid orbiting earth.

See also
 Space elevator
 Space tether
 Asteroid
 List of orbits
 Natural satellite
 Quasi-satellite

References 

Space elevator
Spaceflight concepts